Margaret of Hungary, OP (January 27, 1242 – January 18, 1270) was a Dominican nun and the daughter of King Béla IV of Hungary and Maria Laskarina. She was the younger sister of Kinga of Poland (Kunegunda) and Yolanda of Poland and, through her father, the niece of the famed Elizabeth of Hungary.

Life
Margaret was born in Klis Fortress in the Kingdom of Croatia, the eighth and last daughter (9th of 10 children) of the royal couple. They resided there during the Mongol invasion of Hungary (1241–42) as her father was also ruler of this land. Her parents vowed that if Hungary was liberated from the Mongols, they would dedicate the child to religion.

The three-year-old Margaret was entrusted by her parents to the Dominican monastery at Veszprém in 1245. Six years later she was transferred to the Monastery of the Blessed Virgin founded by her parents on Nyulak Szigete (Rabbit Island) near Buda (today Margaret Island, named after her, and a part of Budapest; the ruins of the monastery can still be seen). She spent the rest of her life there, dedicating herself to religion and opposing all attempts of her father to arrange a political marriage for her with King Ottokar II of Bohemia.

She appears to have taken solemn vows when she was eighteen years old.  In marked contrast to the customs of her Order, she received the Consecration of Virgins along with some other royals to prevent further attempts on the part of her father to have her vows dispensed by the pope for marriage.

Many of the details of her life are known from the Legend of Saint Margaret, written probably in the 14th century and translated from Latin to Hungarian in the 15th. The only remaining copy of the legend is in the Margaret Codex copied by the Dominican nun Lea Ráskay around 1510. According to the legend, Margaret chastised herself from early childhood, wore an iron girdle, hairshirts and shoes spiked with nails and performed the most menial work in the convent. The extravagance of the penances she undertook may have shortened her life. She died on 18 January 1270.

Veneration
She was venerated as a saint soon after her death, e.g., a church dedicated to her in Bocfolde, Zala County, appears in documents dated 1426. Steps were taken to procure her canonization shortly after her death, at the request of her brother King Stephen V. The necessary investigations were taken up between 1270 and 1276, but the canonization process was not successful, even though 74 miracles were ascribed to her intercession, most of them referring to curing illnesses, even someone coming back from the dead. Among those giving testimony were 27 people for whom miracles had been wrought. Unsuccessful attempts to canonize her were also made in 1640 and 1770. She was finally canonized by Pope Pius XII on November 19, 1943, at that time the feast day of her aunt, Saint Elizabeth of Hungary.

Her feast day is celebrated by the Dominican Order.  Raised by Pope Pius VII to a festum duplex, it is the day of her death, January 18.

Her monastery was among those suppressed in 1782, part of the suppression of all monastic orders by the Emperor Joseph II. At that time, her remains were given to the Poor Clares. They were kept in Pozsony (today Bratislava) and Buda. The relics were partly destroyed in 1789 but some portions were preserved and are now kept in Esztergom, Győr, and Pannonhalma.

In art Margaret is usually depicted in a Dominican nun's religious habit, holding a white lily and a book.

Ancestry

See also
 Saint Margaret of Hungary, patron saint archive
Isten, hazánkért térdelünk

References

External links

English article on the homepage of the Catholic Church in Hungary
St. Vincent Ferrer Parish
Catholic Exchange

1242 births
1270 deaths
Dominican nuns
Dominican saints
Beatified and canonised Árpádians
Hungarian Roman Catholic saints
Hungarian princesses
Roman Catholic royal saints
Hungarian people of Greek descent
13th-century Christian saints
Medieval Hungarian saints
Canonizations by Pope Pius XII
13th-century Croatian women
Christian female saints of the Middle Ages
13th-century Hungarian people
13th-century Hungarian women
Beatifications by Pope Pius VI
Daughters of kings